Yucca utahensis is a species in the family Asparagaceae, native to Utah, Nevada and Arizona. McKelvey

Stems are sometimes procumbent, often several per colony, forming colonies of several individuals. Leaves are narrow and needle-like, up to 70 cm long but rarely more than 2 cm wide, with fibers separating along the margins. Flowers are creamy white, nodding, bell-shaped. Fruit is a dry capsule with black seeds.

References

photo of herbarium specimen at Missouri Botanical Garden, 'Yucca utahensis''

utahensis
Plants described in 1947
Flora of Utah
Flora of Arizona
Flora of Nevada